The Jokers Wild Casino is a  locals casino located in Henderson, Nevada.  It is one of the casinos owned by Boyd Gaming Corporation.

It originally opened in 1990 as the Cattle Baron Casino, and closed in 1993. It was reopened on April 1, 1993, as the Jokers Wild Casino.

The casino has over 400 slot machines.

External links
Jokers Wild Casino

Boyd Gaming
Casinos in the Las Vegas Valley
Buildings and structures in Henderson, Nevada
Casinos completed in 1990
1990 establishments in Nevada